Alberini is a surname. Notable people with the surname include:

Cristina Alberini, Italian neuroscientist
Filoteo Alberini (1865–1937), Italian film director
Pietro Alberini (1625–1679), Italian Roman Catholic prelate

See also
Alberni (disambiguation)